The 1981–82 Rugby Football League season was the 87th ever season of professional rugby league football in Britain. Sixteen teams competed from August, 1981 until May, 1982 for the Championship.

Season summary
Slalom Lager League Champions: Leigh
Challenge Cup Winners: Hull F.C. (18-9 v Widnes in replay after 14-14 draw)
Slalom Lager Premiership Trophy Winners: Widnes (23-8 v Hull)
John Player Special Trophy Winners: Hull F.C. (12-4 v Hull Kingston Rovers)
2nd Division Champions: Oldham

Leigh finished on top of the First Division table to claim their second and, to date, last championship, but Widnes won the Rugby League Premiership competition. Fulham, Wakefield Trinity, York and Whitehaven were demoted to the Second Division. Oldham, Carlisle, Workington Town and Halifax were promoted to the First Division.

Cardiff City Blue Dragons and Carlisle joined the competition in Division Two.

Leigh beat Widnes 8–3 to win the Lancashire County Cup, and Castleford beat Bradford Northern 10–5 to win the Yorkshire County Cup.

League Tables

Championship
Final Standings

Second Division

Challenge Cup

The 1981-82 State Express Challenge Cup was won by Hull F.C. after defeating Widnes 18-9 in the final after a replay.

The Final was played at Wembley before a crowd of 92,147 and ended in a 14-14 draw. The replay was played at Elland Road before a crowd of 41,171.

League Cup

Premiership

References
 
1981-82 Rugby Football League season at wigan.rlfans.com

1981 in English rugby league
1982 in English rugby league
Rugby Football League seasons
1981 in Welsh rugby league
1982 in Welsh rugby league